Moutfort (French) is a village in the commune of Contern, in south-western Luxembourg, on both sides of the road from the city of Luxembourg to the German border town Remich. , the village of Moutfort had a population of 1,306 inhabitants, and the associated village of Medingen had 112 inhabitants.

People from 47 nations from all around the world live in the commune of Contern. Out of these, only 64% are of Luxembourgish nationality. This very great mixture of nationalities is due to the proximity of the commune of Contern to the city of Luxembourg, which is reachable by car in 10 minutes.

It is usual to speak four or five languages in daily life, even for many children.

The original population speaks Luxembourgish, an old Southern German named "Mosel-Fränkisch" which has a common root with English. and sounds a bit like Celtic, but which got mixed with many French words assimilated to the Luxembourgish intonation. (for example Eng Girouette or eng pain au chocolat)

Moutfort is situated in the valley of the Syr. The Syr joins the Moselle (French), Mosel (German), Musel (Luxb) in Wasserbillig and the waters of the Syr will then flow into the Rhine at Koblenz, Germany.

Moutfort and the commune of Contern, with the villages Contern, Moutfort, Medingen (Luxbg: Méidéng) and Oetrange (French), (German: Oetringen, Luxembourgish: Éiter) are rich in forests and agriculture

References

External links 

 Official page of the commune of Contern

Contern
Towns in Luxembourg